Gilberto Pogliano (born February 2, 1908 in Turin) was an Italian professional football player.

Honours
 Serie A champion: 1930/31.

1908 births
Year of death missing
Italian footballers
Serie A players
Catania S.S.D. players
Juventus F.C. players
Parma Calcio 1913 players
U.S. Cremonese players
S.S.D. Varese Calcio players
A.C. Cuneo 1905 players
Footballers from Turin
Association football midfielders
Acqui U.S. 1911 players